Leptospermum coriaceum, commonly known as green tea-tree or mallee teatree, is a shrub species that is endemic to south-eastern Australia. It has smooth bark on the younger stems, elliptic to narrow egg-shaped leaves, white flowers and woody fruit. The usual habitat is mallee on sand dunes.

Description
It has rough bark that is shed annually on the larger branches and smooth bark on the younger stems.

Taxonomy and naming
The green tea-tree was first formally described in 1856 by Ferdinand von Mueller who gave it the name Fabricia coriacea and published the description in a paper in the journal Nederlandsch Kruidkundig Archief. (The paper was written by Friedrich Anton Wilhelm Miquel but the name and descriptive paragraphs are attributed to Mueller.) In 1923, Edwin Cheel changed the name to Leptospermum coriaceum. The specific epithet (coriaceum) is a Latin word meaning "leathery".

Distribution and habitat
Leptospermum coriaceum grows in mallee and heath in deep sandy soil on sand dunes from southern South Australia and north western Victoria to south of Cobar in inland New South Wales.

References

coriaceum
Myrtales of Australia
Flora of New South Wales
Flora of Victoria (Australia)
Flora of South Australia
Plants described in 1856